Wendell David Rockwood was a member of the Citizen's Municipal Party and was mayor of Cambridge, Massachusetts, United States, from 1916–1918. He is also a direct descendant of the Puritans of New England.

Life and career 
Wendell was born on April 21, 1863 in Belgrade, Maine to Albion and Sara Jane (Ricker) Rockwood. He had at least one child, Agnes Rockwood Griffiths.

Rockwood was elected mayor of Cambridge, Massachusetts on December 21, 1915, beating Timothy W. Good by 283 votes.

References 

Mayors of Cambridge, Massachusetts

1863 births
Year of death missing